Matthew Cooke or Matt Cooke may refer to:

Matthew Cooke (entomologist) (1829–1887), California's first economic entomologist
Matthew Cooke (fl. 1861), English Freemason and editor of the Matthew Cooke Manuscript
Matthew Cooke (filmmaker) (born 1973), American film producer
Matt Cooke (born 1978), Canadian ice hockey player
Matt Cooke (cyclist) (born 1979), American cyclist
Matt Cooke (journalist) (born 1982), British journalist working for BBC News

See also
Matthew Cook (disambiguation)